The European Quizzing Championships (EQC) are an annual multi-disciplinary quiz event, in which representatives from various countries compete as individuals, in pairs, and/or in teams (club or national).

History
As most of the top players in the world are Europeans, the EQC are almost on a par with the WQC. The playing environment differs drastically, though, as the EQC is played in one place only, in English only (WQC is played in the language of each country) and has several competitions with more than one player (pairs, national teams - for four players, and clubs - also four players). In 2016 the EQC was part of the 2016 Quiz Olympiad.: In 2021 it was part of the 2021 Quiz Olympiad.

The 2010 event attracted media attention from BBC Radio Derby and was the subject also of a BBC Radio 4 documentary presented by the comedian, and quiz enthusiast, Paul Sinha.  The 2006 event in Paris was also the subject of a well received Channel 4 documentary 'Quizzers' by the director Paul Whittaker, shown in the UK as part of the series 'New Shoots'.

In 2020 the event was planned to take place in Kraków from 5 November until 8 November, but was postponed a year due to the COVID-19 pandemic.

Individual champions 

England's Kevin Ashman and Olav Bjortomt are the most successful candidates with six and four individual European titles, respectively.
Belgian Nico Pattyn upset all the locals in 2007 in Blackpool, to become the first Belgian to win the trophy. In 2012, Germany's Holger Waldenberger won with the last question on musician Dr. John, while trailing by one point from Igor Habal. Ronny Swiggers took another Belgian victory in 2013.

Pairs champions 

Introduced in 2005, Belgian and Anglo-Irish pairs have dominated this event.

National Team champions (four players each) 

The English and Belgian teams have contested in most finals, England has won the most titles, nine. The foursome of Kevin Ashman, Mark Bytheway, Pat Gibson and Olav Bjortomt failed to retain the title in 2008 in Oslo, the winning Belgian team composed of Ronny Swiggers, Nico Pattyn, Erik Derycke, and Tom Trogh, but rebounded in 2009.
In 2011 Finland became the third team to win the title, beating Norway in the final. The deciding question after the long and even match with tough questions was about a very common Nordic plant Hepatica. Both teams failed to answer correctly and Finland won. So far five countries have won medals: England, Belgium, Finland, Norway and Estonia.

Club champions (four players each) 

After the first years the event was dominated by two British teams. Since 2007 the questions have been set by a team of quizmasters from different nationalities, in order to eliminate too much local flavour. Milhous Warriors (2006 line-up Kevin Ashman, Mark Bytheway, Tim Westcott, Sean O'Neill) who won in Paris in 2006. Broken Hearts (Olav Bjortomt, Ian Bayley, Mark Grant, David Stainer) made it three straight 2007-2009, then it was Milhous again with Pat Gibson replacing the late Mark Bytheway. 2012 winner JFGI was the first champion to have quizzers from several countries: Tero Kalliolevo and Jussi Suvanto from Finland, Ove Põder and Tauno Vahter from Estonia. In 2012, 2014, 2017, 2018 and 2021 all top three teams included several nationalities.

References

External links

Profiles
 IQA Belgium with full results previous World and European Championships 
IQA Norway with full results previous World Championships
 IQA Great Britain
 IQA United States 
 SQON/IQA Netherlands
Ken Jennings about the 2007 games

Quiz games